Spain competed at the 2020 Summer Olympics in Tokyo, originally scheduled to take place from 24 July to 9 August 2020 but postponed to 23 July to 8 August 2021 because of the COVID-19 pandemic. Since the nation's official debut in 1920, Spanish athletes have appeared in every edition of the Summer Olympic Games, with the exception of the 1936 Summer Olympics in Nazi Germany (from which they withdrew due to the Spanish Civil War), and the 1956 Summer Olympics in Melbourne, as a protest against the Soviet invasion of Hungary. Spain competed in all sports except baseball, rugby sevens, wrestling and surfing.

The nation finished the Games with 17 total medals: three gold, eight silver, and six bronze, matching the overall tally of the 2016 Olympics. Its gold medal haul dropped from 7 to 3. Two of Spain's gold medals were in sports making their Olympic debut this year: karate (Sandra Sánchez, women's kata), and sport climbing (Alberto Ginés López, men's combined).

Medalists

| width="78%" align="left" valign="top" |

| width="22%" align="left" valign="top" |

Competitors
The following is the list of number of competitors participating in the Games. Note that reserves in athletics, equestrian, field hockey, football, handball and water polo are not counted as athletes; however, expanded rosters were considered for field hockey, football, handball and water polo, following the decision of IOC to make them more flexible regarding the possible impact of COVID-19 protocols:

Archery

Spain qualified two archers: one for the men's individual recurve by winning the bronze medal and securing an outright berth available at the 2019 European Games in Minsk, Belarus; and another for the women's individual recurve by earning one of the four spots available at the Europe Continental Qualification Tournament in Antalya, Turkey.

Artistic swimming

Spain fielded a squad of eight artistic swimmers to compete across all events by winning the silver medal and securing the second of three available spots in the women's team routine at the 2021 FINA Olympic Qualification Tournament in Barcelona, Spain.

Athletics

Spanish athletes achieved the entry standards, either by qualifying time or by world ranking, in the following track and field events (up to a maximum of 3 athletes in each event).: Although selected, Irene Sánchez-Escribano could not compete in the 3000 m steeplechase due to a last minute injury. 2016 silver medallist Orlando Ortega got injured while training already at Japan days before the competition and could not take place.

Track & road events
Men

Women

Mixed

Field events
Men

Women

Combined events – Men's decathlon

Combined events – Women's heptathlon

Badminton

Spain entered two badminton players (one per gender) into the Olympic tournament. 2014 Youth Olympian Clara Azurmendi, with Pablo Abián playing in the badminton court at his fourth consecutive Games on the men's side, was automatically selected among the top 40 individual shuttlers in their respective singles events. based on the BWF World Race to Tokyo Rankings. Reigning Olympic champion Carolina Marín was initially chosen but pulled out from the Games due to a knee injury.

Basketball

Summary

Men's tournament

Spain men's basketball team qualified for the Games by reaching the semifinal stage and securing an outright berth as one of two highest-ranked squads from Europe at the 2019 FIBA Basketball World Cup in China.

Team roster

Group play

Quarterfinal

Women's tournament

Spain women's basketball team qualified for the Olympics as one of three highest-ranked eligible squads from group B at the Belgrade meet of the 2020 FIBA Women's Olympic Qualifying Tournament.

Team roster

Group play

Quarterfinal

Boxing

Spain entered four boxers into the Olympic tournament. Fourth-seeded Gabriel Escobar (men's flyweight), José Quiles (men's featherweight), Russian-born Gazimagomed Jalidov (men's light heavyweight), and Emmanuel Reyes (men's heavyweight) secured the spots on the Spanish squad in their respective weight divisions, either by winning the round of 16 match, advancing to the semifinal match, or scoring a box-off triumph, at the 2020 European Qualification Tournament in London and Paris.

Canoeing

Slalom
Spanish canoeists qualified boats in all four classes through the 2019 ICF Canoe Slalom World Championships in La Seu d'Urgell, Spain.

Sprint
Spanish canoeists qualified four boats in the 2019 ICF Canoe Sprint World Championships in Szeged, Hungary, Meanwhile, three additional boats were awarded to the Spanish canoeists each in the men's C-2 1000 m, women's K-1 500 m, and women's C-1 200 m, respectively, with their top-two placements at the 2021 European Canoe Sprint Qualification Regatta. The team was announced on 15 May 2021, excepting the women's C-1 canoeist who would be decided later.

Men

Women

Qualification Legend: Q = Qualify to semifinals; q = Qualify to quarterfinals; FA = Qualify to final (medal); FB = Qualify to final B (non-medal); FC = Qualify to final C (non-medal)

Cycling

Road
Spain entered a squad of seven riders (five men and two women) to compete in their respective Olympic road races, by virtue of their top 6 national finish (for men) and top 22 (for women) in the UCI World Ranking.

Men

Women

Track
Following the completion of the 2020 UCI Track Cycling World Championships, Spanish riders accumulated spots for both men's madison and omnium, based on the country's results in the final UCI Olympic rankings.

Omnium

Madison

Mountain biking
Spanish mountain bikers qualified for three quota places (two men's and one women's) into the Olympic cross-country race, as a result of the nation's sixth-place finish for men and twentieth for women, respectively, in the UCI Olympic Ranking List of 16 May 2021.

Diving

Spain sent two divers into the Olympic competition by finishing among the top 18 in the men's springboard at the 2021 FINA World Cup in Tokyo, Japan.

Equestrian

Spanish equestrians qualified a full squad in the team dressage competition by virtue of a top-six finish at the 2018 FEI World Equestrian Games in Tryon, North Carolina, United States. MeanwhIle, two riders were added to the Spanish roster based on the following results in the individual FEI Olympic rankings: a top two finish outside the group selection for Group B (South Western Europe) in eventing and a highest overall placement outside the group and continental selection in jumping.

Dressage

Qualification Legend: Q = Qualified for the final; q = Qualified for the final as a lucky loserTF = Substituted for the team final

Eventing

Jumping

Fencing

Spain entered one fencer into the Olympic competition, marking the country's return to the sport for the first time since 2008. Carlos Llavador claimed a spot in the men's foil as one of the two highest-ranked fencers vying for qualification from Europe in the FIE Adjusted Official Rankings.

Field hockey

Summary

Men's tournament

Spain men's field hockey team qualified for the Olympics by securing one of the seven tickets available and defeating France in a playoff at the Valencia leg of the 2019 FIH Olympic Qualifiers.

Team roster

Group play

Quarterfinal

Women's tournament

Spain women's field hockey team qualified for the Olympics by securing one of the seven tickets available and defeating South Korea in a playoff at the Valencia leg of the 2019 FIH Olympic Qualifiers.

Team roster

Group play

Quarterfinal

Football

Summary

Men's tournament

Spain men's football team qualified for the Games by reaching the semifinal stage and securing an outright berth at the 2019 UEFA European Under-21 Championship in Italy, signifying the country's return to the Olympic football scene for the first time since London 2012.

Team roster

Group play

Quarterfinal

Semifinal

Gold medal match

Golf

Spain entered four golfers (two per gender) into the Olympic tournament. Jon Rahm (world no. 1), Adri Arnaus (world no. 147), Carlota Ciganda (world no. 32), and Azahara Muñoz (world no. 84) qualified directly among the top 60 eligible players for their respective events based on the IGF World Rankings. Sergio García (world no. 48) and Rafa Cabrera-Bello (world no. 140) qualified but opted not to play. Later, Jon Rahm tested positive for COVID-19 and was replaced by Jorge Campillo

Gymnastics

Artistic
Spain fielded two full teams of four gymnasts each into the Olympic competition for the first time since Athens 2004. Both men's and women's squads secured each one of the remaining nine places in the team all-around at the 2019 World Championships in Stuttgart, Germany.

Men
Team

Individual

Women
Team

Individual

Handball

Summary

Men's tournament

Spain men's handball team qualified for the Olympics by winning the gold medal and securing an outright berth at the final match of the 2020 European Men's Handball Championship in Stockholm, Sweden.

Team roster

Group play

Quarterfinal

Semifinal

Bronze medal game

Women's tournament

Spain women's handball team qualified for the Olympics by securing a top-two finish at the Llíria leg of the 2020 IHF Olympic Qualification Tournament.

Team roster
 Women's team event – 1 team of 15 players

Group play

Judo
 
Spain qualified seven judoka (three men and four women) for each of the following weight classes at the Games. Six of them, highlighted by Georgian-born and two-time world champion Nikoloz Sherazadishvili (men's middleweight, 90 kg) and Rio 2016 Olympians Francisco Garrigós (men's extra-lightweight, 60 kg) and María Bernabéu (women's middleweight, 70 kg), were selected among the top 18 judoka of their respective weight classes based on the IJF World Ranking List of 28 June 2021, while Cristina Cabaña (women's half-middleweight, 73 kg) accepted a continental berth from Europe as the nation's top-ranked judoka outside of direct qualifying position.

Men

Women

Karate
 
Spain entered two karateka into the inaugural Olympic tournament. Defending European Games champions Damián Quintero and Sandra Sánchez qualified directly for their respective individual kata categories by finishing among the top four karateka at the end of the combined WKF Olympic Rankings.

Kata

Modern pentathlon

Spain entered one modern pentathlete into the Olympic competition for the first time since Beijing 2008. Aleix Heredia finished sixth of the top eight modern pentathletes vying for qualification in the men's event based on the UIPM World Rankings of 1 June 2021.

Rowing

Spain qualified three boats for each of the following rowing classes into the Olympic regatta, with the majority of crews confirming Olympic places for their boats at the 2019 FISA World Championships in Ottensheim, Austria.

Qualification Legend: FA=Final A (medal); FB=Final B (non-medal); FC=Final C (non-medal); FD=Final D (non-medal); FE=Final E (non-medal); FF=Final F (non-medal); SA/B=Semifinals A/B; SC/D=Semifinals C/D; SE/F=Semifinals E/F; QF=Quarterfinals; R=Repechage

Sailing

Spanish sailors qualified one boat in each of the following classes through the 2018 Sailing World Championships, the class-associated Worlds, and the continental regattas.

At the end of 2019 season, the Royal Spanish Sailing Federation announced the first set of sailors to compete at the Enoshima regatta, namely windsurfer Blanca Manchón, Rio 2016 Olympian Jordi Xammar and his new partner Nicolás Rodríguez in the men's 470 class.  The 49er, 49erFX, and Nacra 17 crews, highlighted by London 2012 gold medalist Támara Echegoyen, were named on 19 February 2020, with the women's 470 crew joining them before the end of March 2020. Ángel Granda (men's RS:X) was added to the list of confirmed Spanish athletes for the rescheduled Games on 16 March 2021, with Cristina Pujol (women's Laser Radial) rounded out the selection a month later.

Men

Women

Mixed

M = Medal race; EL = Eliminated – did not advance into the medal race

Shooting

Spanish shooters achieved quota places for the following events by virtue of their best finishes at the 2018 ISSF World Championships, the 2019 ISSF World Cup series, European Championships or Games, and European Qualifying Tournament, as long as they obtained a minimum qualifying score (MQS) by 31 May 2020.

Skateboarding

Spain entered four skateboarders (two men and two women) to compete across all events at the Games. Danny León, Jaime Mateu, and Julia Benedetti were automatically selected among the top 16 eligible skateboarders in the men's and women's park, respectively, based on the World Skate Olympic Rankings of 30 June 2021. Andrea Benítez later replaced the skateboarder Candy Jacobs after she tested positive in COVID-19 and had to withdraw from the Games.

Sport climbing

Spain entered one sport climber into the Olympic tournament. Alberto Ginés qualified directly for the men's combined event, by advancing to the final and securing one of the six provisional berths at the IFSC World Olympic Qualifying Event in Toulouse, France.

Swimming

Spanish swimmers further achieved qualifying standards in the following events (up to a maximum of 2 swimmers in each event at the Olympic Qualifying Time (OQT), and potentially 1 at the Olympic Selection Time (OST)): To assure their selection to the Spanish roster, swimmers must attain the Olympic qualifying cut in the final (or in heat-declared winner races on time for long-distance freestyle) of each individual pool event at one of three domestic meets sanctioned by FINA and the Royal Spanish Swimming Federation (RFEN): the International Castalia-Castellón Trophy (8–9 December 2020 in Castellón), the Spanish Open (24–28 March 2021 in Sabadell), and the European Championships (17–23 May 2021 in Budapest), if necessary and available.

Additionally, open water swimmers Alberto Martínez and Paula Ruiz secured their berths, the first at the 2019 FINA World Championships in Gwangju, South Korea, and the later at the 2021 FINA Olympic Marathon Swim Qualifier in Setúbal, Portugal .

Men

Women

Table tennis
 
Spain entered three athletes into the table tennis competition at the Games. Álvaro Robles scored a second-stage final triumph to secure one of the five available places in the men's singles, while Maria Xiao booked the last of four women's singles spots with a third-stage final victory at the European Qualification Tournament in Odivelas, Portugal. Three-time Olympian Galia Dvorak was automatically selected among the top ten table tennis players vying for qualification to join Xiao in the same event based on the ITTF Olympic Rankings of 1 June 2021.

Taekwondo

Spain entered four athletes into the taekwondo competition at the Games. Rio 2016 Olympian Jesús Tortosa (men's 58 kg), Javier Pérez (men's 68 kg), and Raúl Martínez (men's 80 kg) qualified directly for their respective weight classes by finishing among the top five taekwondo practitioners at the end of the WT Olympic Rankings, although Jesús Tortosa was later replaced by Adrián Vicente following a technical decision of the Spanish Federation of Taekwondo. Meanwhile, 17-year-old Adriana Cerezo scored a semifinal victory in the women's flyweight category (49 kg) to book the remaining spot on the Spanish taekwondo squad at the 2021 European Qualification Tournament in Sofia, Bulgaria.

Tennis

Spain entered eight tennis players (four per gender) into the Olympic tournament. Pablo Carreño (world no. 12), Alejandro Davidovich (world no. 35), and Pablo Andújar (world no. 70), with Roberto Carballés (world no. 100) replacing the world-number-three tennis player and two-time gold medalist Rafael Nadal to take the fourth slot, qualified directly among the top 56 eligible players in the men's singles based on the ATP World Rankings. Garbiñe Muguruza (world no. 13), Paula Badosa (world no. 33), and Sara Sorribes (world no. 53), with the veteran Carla Suárez Navarro earning her fourth consecutive trip to the Games, occupied the four of the 56 available slots to compete in the women's singles based on their WTA World Rankings of 13 June 2021.

Men

Women

Triathlon

Spain entered five triathletes (three men and two women) to compete at the Olympics. London 2012 silver medalist Javier Gómez Noya, along with Rio 2016 Olympians Fernando Alarza and Mario Mola, was selected among the top 26 triathletes vying for qualification in the men's event based on the individual ITU World Rankings of 15 June 2021, with Miriam Casillas and rookie Anna Godoy taking the two slots on the women's side.

Relay

Volleyball

Beach
Spain women's beach volleyball pair qualified for the Games by advancing to the final match and securing an outright berth at the 2019 FIVB World Olympic Qualifying Tournament in Haiyang, China; Meanwhile, the men's beach volleyball pair received an automatic spot for the tournament by virtue of their nation's top 15 placement in the FIVB Olympic Rankings of 13 June 2021.

Water polo

Summary

Men's tournament
 
Spain men's water polo team qualified for the Olympics by advancing to the final match and securing an outright berth at the 2019 FINA World Championships in Gwangju, South Korea.

Team roster

Group play

Quarterfinal

Semifinal

Bronze medal game

Women's tournament
 
Spain women's water polo team qualified for the Olympics by advancing to the final match and securing an outright berth, as the next highest-ranked squad, at the 2019 FINA World Championships in Gwangju, South Korea.

Team roster

Group play

Quarterfinal

Semifinal

Gold medal game

Weightlifting

Spain entered four weightlifters (three men and one woman) into the Olympic competition. Three-time medalist Lydia Valentín (women's 87 kg) and rookie Marcos Ruiz (men's +109 kg) finished among the top eight entrants in their respective weight categories based on the IWF Absolute World Rankings, with Rio 2016 Olympian David Sánchez and two-time Olympian Andrés Mata dominating the field of weightlifters vying for qualification from Europe in the men's 73 and 81 kg categories, respectively, based on the IWF Absolute Continental Rankings.

References

Nations at the 2020 Summer Olympics
2020
2021 in Spanish sport